Gary Rogers (born 25 September 1981) is an Irish coach and former professional footballer who played as a goalkeeper. Rogers was also called up to the Republic of Ireland national football team. He also played Gaelic football for and coached the Meath county team, and has also coached the Cavan, Monaghan and Westmeath county teams.

Playing career

Shelbourne
Rogers played with St Francis when he was younger and was spotted by Dermot Keely and was brought to the Shelbourne youth team. While with the youth team, he had a trial at Stockport County. He did not get a contract and upon his return he never made a first-team appearance for Shelbourne. He played for St Francis in the First Division for one season in 2000–01.

Drogheda United
At the age of 19 he moved to Drogheda United. He was a regular in the first team helping the club to promotion to the top flight in his first season and was the main factor in the Drogheda brilliant defensive record. He picked up his first FAI medal when he was part of the Drogheda FAI Cup winning squad in 2005.

Dublin City & Bray Wanderers
Disappointed with a lack of first-team appearances, he joined Dermot Keely's Dublin City in December 2005. However six months into his contract Dublin City pulled out of the League of Ireland and Rogers was without a club. He subsequently signed for Bray Wanderers. He stayed at Bray until the start of the 2007 season.

Galway United
He signed for Galway United in February 2007, who were newly promoted to the Premier Division. Upon his signing, manager Tony Cousins said of Rogers: "Gary is a top class goalkeeper, has a lot of experience in the League of Ireland and I'm delighted to add a player of his ability to the team." Rogers became the first-choice goalkeeper and helped the Tribesmen stay up in his first season with the club. However, Cousins was sacked at the start of the 2008 season. New manager Jeff Kenna came in April and Galway's form improved in the latter part of the season, and clean sheets against Finn Harps and UCD, who were both subsequently relegated, helped the Tribesmen stay up.

St Patrick's Athletic
Rogers followed Jeff Kenna to Dublin side St Patrick's Athletic at the beginning of the 2009 season. Saints goalkeeper Barry Ryan moved in the opposite direction vacating the goalkeepers' jersey. Kenna was sacked after a poor start with the club. Rogers remained at the club for the following season under Pete Mahon and was voted Player of the Month for March 2010 having kept clean sheets in the opening five games if the season. Rogers was part of the League of Ireland XI side that played Manchester United in the opening game at the Aviva Stadium. Rogers was voted by the Ultras group the 'Shed End Invincibles' as their Player of the Year. He re-signed for the Saints on 30 November 2010.

Rogers was part of St. Patrick's European run in 2009, which saw the club reach the 2009–10 UEFA Europa League play-off round keeping clean sheets against Valletta F.C. and FC Krylia Sovetov Samara. Two years later Pats again played 3 rounds in the 2011–12 UEFA Europa League where he kept clean sheets against Íþróttabandalag Vestmannaeyja and FC Shakhter Karagandy.

Gary made his 100th appearance for the Saints against Dundalk on 13 June 2011.

Sligo Rovers
In December 2011 Rogers signed for Sligo Rovers and has established himself as the club's number 1. He helped the club to a first league title in 35 years in 2012 playing every league game until after the title was secured. 2013 saw him play Champions League football for the first time as Rovers were beaten by Molde of Norway. He kept a career best 26 clean sheets during the season.

Dundalk
Rogers signed for Dundalk in November 2014. In his first season, he won both the Premier Division and the FAI Cup. He also appeared in the qualifying rounds of the 2015–16 UEFA Champions League as Dundalk went out to BATE Borisov. He was part of the Dundalk side that made Irish footballing history by reaching the play-off round of the 2016–17 UEFA Champions League, where they lost 3–1 on aggregate to Polish side Legia Warsaw, dropping into the group stages of the Europa League as a result. He went on to become a big part of following league campaigns, picking up league medals in 2018 and 2019.

Retirement
In December 2020, after the 2020 League of Ireland season, Rogers  announced his retirement from football after a 21-year career. His last game was against Arsenal in Group B of the 2020–21 UEFA Europa League group stage.

European competition
Rogers holds the record for most appearances in European competition for an Irish domestic player (54).

International career
In May 2016, Rogers was added to the Republic of Ireland squad for their friendly against the Netherlands as back-up due to the unavailability of Keiren Westwood and David Forde. He was again called up by Martin O'Neill for a friendly with Oman and a World Cup qualifier against Serbia.

Coaching career
He was ratified as Gaelic football goalkeeping coach of the Meath county team in 2018.

He has also served in similar roles with the Cavan and Westmeath county teams.

In January 2021, he was confirmed as goalkeeping coach of the Monaghan county team.

In June 2021, following his retirement from football, Rogers returned to his former club Drogheda United as a goalkeeping coach

Personal life
Rogers is a native of Navan in County Meath. He grew up playing Gaelic football for his local club, St Ultan's. A three-month ban following an altercation with a referee playing for St Ultan's resulted in him deciding to concentrate on a football career at the age of 17. When his then League of Ireland club, Dublin City, went out of existence in 2006, Rogers returned to playing Gaelic football and appeared in two National Football League games for Meath, before being offered a contract at Galway United and deciding to resume his professional football career. Gary's uncle Liam Devine scored for Dundalk against Linfield and Hibs of Malta in the 1979–80 European Cup.

Honours
Drogheda United
League of Ireland First Division (1): 2001–02
FAI Cup (1): 2005

St Patrick's Athletic
Leinster Senior Cup (1): 2011

Sligo Rovers
League of Ireland Premier Division (1): 2012
FAI Cup (1): 2013
Setanta Sports Cup (1): 2014

Dundalk
League of Ireland Premier Division (4):  2015, 2016, 2018, 2019
FAI Cup (3): 2015, 2018, 2020
League of Ireland Cup (2): 2017, 2019
President's Cup (2): 2015, 2019
Leinster Senior Cup (1): 2015
Champions Cup (1): 2019

Career statistics

Club

Sources
 DUFC A Claret and Blue History by Brian Whelan (2010)

References

External links
FAI Stats Portal Profile

1981 births
Living people
Gaelic footballers who switched code
Gaelic football goalkeeping coaches
Meath inter-county Gaelic footballers
Cavan county football team
Monaghan county football team
Westmeath county football team
Association football goalkeepers
Republic of Ireland association footballers
Sportspeople from County Meath
Shelbourne F.C. players
Drogheda United F.C. players
Bray Wanderers F.C. players
Galway United F.C. (1937–2011) players
St Patrick's Athletic F.C. players
Sligo Rovers F.C. players
Dundalk F.C. players
League of Ireland players
League of Ireland XI players
St Francis F.C. players